Buffalo Airways is a family-run airline based in Yellowknife, Northwest Territories, Canada, established in 1970. Buffalo Airways was launched by Bob Gauchie and later sold to one of his pilots, Joe McBryan (aka "Buffalo Joe"). It operates charter passenger, charter cargo, firefighting, and fuel services, and formerly operated scheduled passenger service. Its main base is at Yellowknife Airport (CYZF). It has two other bases at Hay River/Merlyn Carter Airport (CYHY) and Red Deer Regional Airport (CYQF). The Red Deer base is the main storage and maintenance facility. The airline is also the subject of the History television reality series Ice Pilots NWT.  The company slogan is Your passage to the North.

Clothing company, television show, and media
In 2007, Buffalo Airways began producing a clothing line that included T-shirts, hoodies, and hats. With the introduction of the Canwest Global (now Shaw Media) television show Ice Pilots NWT, Buffalo has expanded its clothing company to feature over 30 products and launched a full-service product website called BuffaloAirWear.com. The show, which is produced by Omnifilm Entertainment and shown on History, features the day-to-day operations at Buffalo Airways.

In 2011, Buffalo Airways was involved in a recreation of the historic Dam Busters raids of World War II, flying the mission, with their own plane and pilots. Buffalo dropped an inert reproduction of the 'Upkeep' bouncing bomb from their Douglas DC-4. The project was documented in the television show Dambusters Fly Again in Canada, Dambusters: Building the Bouncing Bomb in the UK, and Nova season 39 episode "Bombing Hitler's Dams" in the US. A behind-the-scenes look was also filmed in the Ice Pilots NWT season 3 episode 2 show "Dambusters".

In 2012, Arctic Air, a Canadian aviation drama, used Buffalo Airways hangar as a backdrop for scenes in the show. During a tour of Buffalo Airways' hangar, given by Director of Operations, Mikey McBryan, he explained how the TV show used tarps to cover the Buffalo Airways insignia.

On 27 July 2012, Bruce Dickinson, lead singer of Iron Maiden, flew up from Edmonton to Yellowknife with Buffalo Airways. On 28 July, Dickinson, who holds an airline transport pilot licence, flew a Douglas DC-3 to Yellowknife and spent a day as a guest star for a season five episode.

In August 2019, owner Joe McBryan was made a member of the Order of the Northwest Territories to honour his work in aviation.

Buffalo Air Express
Buffalo operates a courier service as Buffalo Air Express which started in 1982-1983. It offers service throughout the Northwest Territories (NWT) and Northern Alberta. In association with Global Interline Network it can ship around the world from bases in Yellowknife, Edmonton and Hay River.

Firefighting

Under contract for the NWT Government, Buffalo Airways operate and maintain aircraft used in the aerial firefighting program. Aircraft include both bird dog and waterbombers. The waterbombers are assisted by smaller aircraft known as "bird dogs" which are used to help spot wildfires as well as guide waterbombers during operations

Current water bomber aircraft include eight amphibious Air Tractor 802 Fireboss and two specially converted Lockheed L-188 Electra. Bird Dog aircraft include the Gulfstream/Rockwell 690, and the Beech King Air.

Former aircraft used include the amphibious Canadair CL-215, the Douglas C-54/DC-4, and the Canso PBY-5.

Buffalo School of Aviation
Buffalo's aviation school offers an aircraft maintenance engineer program and several other courses. According to Transport Canada listings, it has three aircraft, two are single-engine fixed wing, an Aeronca Champion and a Fleet Canuck, the third a helicopter is a Robinson R22. The Buffalo website also lists a Bell 206 helicopter and a Beech 90 King Air.

Destinations
The airline operated scheduled passenger services between Hay River and Yellowknife from August 1986 until November 2015. However, due to the suspension of the Air Operator Certificate scheduled service was replaced in December 2015, when the company chartered aircraft to make the run. The charter service was cancelled 24 December. As of Spring 2019 Buffalo has not resumed passenger service and currently does not have trained flight attendants making passenger service unlikely in the near future. It carried over 186,000 passengers from 1986 to 2015. Scheduled cargo services transport supplies from Yellowknife to Deline, Fort Good Hope, Norman Wells, and Tulita under contract with the Government of the Northwest Territories. The service also includes an airport shuttle and a medical transfer bus. Buffalo also offers charters on their passenger aircraft across Canada and also offers cargo charters.

Fleet
As of August 2019, according to Transport Canada the fleet numbered 57, with two more aircraft registered to the Buffalo School of Aviation. In addition the U.S. Federal Aviation Administration had one aircraft registered to Buffalo Airways USA.

KG330 (C-GWZS)
This Buffalo Airways DC-3 flew on D-Day dropping paratroopers over Normandy as part of 512 Squadron. KG330 left RAF Broadwell for Operation Tonga at precisely 23:15. It would have been part of 'C' flight as it crossed the English Channel towards its drop zone. It would be dropping the 9th Parachute Battalion as part of the 6th Airborne Division. The paratroopers it was dropping were sent to destroy a heavy coastal battery and to position themselves on the canal between Caen and the port at Ouistreham. The coastal defence had earlier been successfully bombed by 100 Avro Lancaster bombers of RAF Bomber Command. The visibility is said to have been good, no casualties were reported and the aircraft returned to base at 03:35.

Air Operator Certificate
On 30 November 2015, Transport Canada suspended Buffalo Airways' Air Operator Certificate, citing the airline's poor safety record. This prohibited Buffalo Airways from operating commercial air services, until it could prove that it is capable of meeting all safety regulations on a consistent basis. Service was maintained using chartered aircraft. On 12 January 2016, the licence was reinstated.

Accidents and incidents
Buffalo Airways has nine accidents listed by the Aviation Safety Network, none of which had any fatalities. In addition to the Aviation Safety Network, there are two more reported incidents that were investigated by the Transportation Board of Canada. The Transportation Safety Board of Canada (TSB) is an independent agency that advances transportation safety by investigating occurrences in the marine, pipeline, rail, and air modes of transportation.

On 26 June 1994, BFL526, a Douglas C-47A (C-FROD), crashed on approach to Fort Simpson Airport, Northwest Territories due to fuel exhaustion. The aircraft was on a cargo flight from Trout Lake Airport. There were two crew on board at the time; both were injured and the aircraft was a write-off.
Another aircraft landed on the lake and picked up the two crew. The aircraft was pulled out of the water; the engines and other valuable parts removed. The hull, which was left at the lake, was later retrieved by Fairview Aircraft Restorations Society and taken to Fairview, Alberta, where it is undergoing restoration.
On 28 August 2002, BFL928, a Douglas C-54E (C-GQIC), landed short of the runway at Diavik Airport. The right wing came off the aircraft, which travelled  down the runway. The aircraft caught fire and was a write-off. The two crew escaped with minor injuries.
On 1 August 2003, Douglas C-54G C-GBSK touched down short of the runway at the Ulu mine strip. The landing gear collapsed and the wings separated from the fuselage. The wings then caught fire and the fuselage veered off the right side of the runway. The four crew were unhurt, but the aircraft was written off.
On 25 May 2004, BFL326, a loaded Curtiss C-46D (C-FAVO), was seriously damaged at Yellowknife Airport while taxiing for departure. The company reported the tail wheel went off the threshold of runway 09 (now runway 10) while turning to align with the active runway for take-off, sinking into a soft gravel area in a 90° position from centreline. The crew applied power to try and free the stuck aircraft which resulted in a sideways loading of the tailwheel bulkhead at station 720, causing structural failure at the tail wheel to fuselage attachment points as well as buckling of the main fuselage between station 615 and 633. The incident caused the runway to remain closed for about six hours until the aircraft could be repaired sufficiently to allow safe removal. Although the aircraft was substantially damaged, it was subsequently repaired and returned to active service using a section cut from a derelict airframe of Everts Air Cargo Express, Fairbanks, Alaska; 42-96578 - N4860V
On 5 January 2006, BFL1405, a Douglas C-54G (C-GXKN), had departed Norman Wells Airport when the number two engine caught fire and stopped. The crew attempted to put out the fire but were not successful. While feathering the number two propeller, number one also feathered, leaving them with only two engines. They returned to Norman Wells and performed an emergency landing, but the aircraft left the runway and ploughed through the snow. The four crew were unhurt, but the aircraft was written off and the nose was later used to repair another C-54. The fire was caused by a fuel leak.
On 9 April 2006, C-FTXB, a CL-215 bomber Buffalo sold to the Turkish government belly landed on the runway at İzmir Adnan Menderes Airport after the Turkish crew failed to deploy the landing gear causing damage to the hull. Buffalo had to have new drop doors flown in to replace the ones the Turks damaged in the crash. 
On 29 December 2006, BFL129, a Douglas C-54A (C-GPSH), suffered a nose gear collapse following a runway excursion while landing on an ice strip at Carat Lake near Jericho Diamond Mine. The aircraft's nose dropped over an embankment at the end of the runway, damaging the nose section. The aircraft was transporting  of diesel in fuel cells, and some of these broke loose, spilling some of the fuel. The nose section, which could not be salvaged, was repaired in July 2007 with the nose section from C-54 C-GXKN.
On 5 March 2012, BFL1105, a Lockheed L-188A Electra (C-FBAQ), landed at the Yellowknife Airport but was unable to extend the right main landing gear. The aircraft landed on the left and nose gear and caused substantial damage to the number three and four propellers and wing. The five occupants on board were uninjured.
On 9 November 2012, BFL509, a Curtiss C-46A (C-GTXW), landed at Yellowknife Airport and when it rolled to the runway 16/34 intersection, the left main landing gear collapsed. The aircraft then came to rest on the left wing and suffered substantial damage. The aircraft was repaired and returned to service. The cause of the accident was that a hammer, lodged between the inboard drag strut and sliding member, caused the landing gear to collapse.
On 19 August 2013, BFL168, a Douglas DC-3C (C-GWIR), crashed on return to Yellowknife Airport, Northwest Territories after suffering an engine fire. The aircraft was on a passenger flight from Yellowknife Airport to Hay River Airport. There were 24 people on board the aircraft, of whom three were crew. There were no fatalities, but the aircraft was written off. The subsequent investigation determined the cause to be an engine cylinder fatigue crack, propeller feathering pump failure, and overloading of the aircraft.
On 25 September 2015, BFL525, a Curtiss C-46A (C-GTXW), diverted to Deline Airport following engine problems, where it made an emergency gear-up landing. Although the aircraft was written off, the four crew were not injured. An initial investigation by Buffalo Airways revealed that the oil scavenge pump had failed on the number two engine.
On 3 May 2019, BFL169, a Douglas DC-3 (C-GJKM) suffered an engine failure and force-landed outside Hay River. The aircraft left Hay River shortly before 8:00 on Friday before experiencing an engine failure southeast of the airfield, the Transportation Safety Board of Canada said. Two crew were on board, the safety board said. Both were uninjured. The airframe remains at Hay River without its wings and tail, awaiting a final decision from Buffalo Airways as to whether to repair it.

See also
 Era Alaska - another airline with a reality TV show based on it
 Canadian North - operating the Yellowknife - Hay River service

References

External links 

Buffalo Airways Buffalo Airways Website
BuffaloAirWear.com
Buffalo Air Express
Ice Pilots NWT  History Television TV Series Website
Buffalo Airways at Red Deer Airport 2006
Buffalo Airways at Red Deer Airport 2007

Air Transport Association of Canada
Airlines established in 1970
Regional airlines of the Northwest Territories
Former seaplane operators